Anne Démians d'Archimbaud is a French architect who opened her first agency in 1995. In 2003, she established Architectures Anne Démians in Montreuil, near Paris. The agency has designed office buildings, a freight station, school kitchens and several residential developments.

Biography
Born in Colmar, Démians studied architecture at the École nationale supérieure d'architecture de Versailles, graduating in 1987.

Her mixed-use Quai Ouest project in the centre of Nancy has attracted considerable attention. Completed in 2015, the  building with 640 oblong windows houses offices, a hotel and a number of stores.

In May 2015, Démians won the competition for renovating the ESPCI ParisTech and converting it into a major research centre. Her design includes  of additional space, mainly for laboratories.

Since 1998, Démians has taught at the schools of architecture in Brittany, Paris and Berlin. In 2015, she became a member of the Académie d'architecture founded in 1953, open to those who have made major contributions to architecture and urban planning.

Selected projects
Anne Démians' recent projects include:

2006: Central kitchen for the Caisse des écoles, Paris, completed 2012
2009: Luxury housing, Batignolles, Paris
2010: Winner of competition for 350 housing units in Auteuil
2010: Winner of competition for a speculative office building in Batignolles
2011: Building in Nancy with housing units, student residence and shops
2011: Winner of restricted competition for Société Générale's head office in Fontenay-sous-Bois
2012: Winner of competition for three tower blocks in Strasbourg

References

Literature

External links

Living people
20th-century French architects
21st-century French architects
French women architects
People from Colmar
Year of birth missing (living people)
20th-century French women
21st-century French women